5-HT receptors, 5-hydroxytryptamine receptors, or serotonin receptors,  are a group of G protein-coupled receptor and ligand-gated ion channels found in the central and peripheral nervous systems. They mediate both excitatory and inhibitory neurotransmission. The serotonin receptors are activated by the neurotransmitter serotonin, which acts as their natural ligand.

The serotonin receptors modulate the release of many neurotransmitters, including glutamate, GABA, dopamine, epinephrine / norepinephrine, and acetylcholine, as well as many hormones, including oxytocin, prolactin, vasopressin, cortisol, corticotropin, and substance P, among others. Serotonin receptors influence various biological and neurological processes such as aggression, anxiety, appetite, cognition, learning, memory, mood, nausea, sleep, and thermoregulation. They are the target of a variety of pharmaceutical and recreational drugs, including many antidepressants, antipsychotics, anorectics, antiemetics, gastroprokinetic agents, antimigraine agents, hallucinogens, and entactogens.

Serotonin receptors are found in almost all animals and are even known to regulate longevity and behavioral aging in the primitive nematode, Caenorhabditis elegans.

Classification 
5-hydroxytryptamine receptors or 5-HT receptors, or serotonin receptors are found in the central and peripheral nervous systems. 
They can be divided into 7 families of G protein-coupled receptors which activate an intracellular second messenger cascade to produce an excitatory or inhibitory response. The exception to this is the 5-HT3 receptor which is a ligand-gated ion channel.  
In 2014, a novel 5-HT receptor was isolated from the small white butterfly, Pieris rapae, and named pr5-HT8. It does not occur in mammals and shares relatively low similarity to the known 5-HT receptor classes.

Families

Subtypes

The 7 general serotonin receptor classes include a total of 14 known serotonin receptors. The specific types have been characterized as follows:

Note that there is no 5-HT1C receptor since, after the receptor was cloned and further characterized, it was found to have more in common with the 5-HT2 family of receptors and was redesignated as the 5-HT2C receptor.

Very nonselective agonists of 5-HT receptor subtypes include ergotamine (an antimigraine), which activates 5-HT1A, 5-HT1D, 5-HT1B, D2 and norepinephrine receptors. LSD (a psychedelic) is a 5-HT1A, 5-HT2A, 5-HT2C, 5-HT5A and 5-HT6 agonist.

Expression patterns
The genes coding for serotonin receptors are expressed across the mammalian brain. Genes coding for different receptors types follow different developmental curves. Specifically, there is a developmental increase of HTR5A expression in several subregions of the human cortex, paralleled by a decreased expression of HTR1A from the embryonic period to the post-natal one.

5-HT-like
A number of receptors were classed as "5-HT-like" - by 1998 it was being argued that, since these receptors  were "a heterogeneous population of 5-HT1B, 5-HT1D and 5-HT7" receptors the classification was redundant.

References

External links 
 
 
 
 

Serotonin receptors